Vyacheslav Sergeyevich Dmitriyev (born 28 May 1990) is a Russian professional footballer.

Club career
Dmitriyev made his professional debut in the Russian Football National League in 2008 for FC Torpedo Moscow.

On 1 June 2019, Dmitriyev was released by FC Pyunik.

References

External links
 
 

1990 births
People from Vyazma
Living people
Russian footballers
Russia youth international footballers
Russia under-21 international footballers
Association football defenders
Association football midfielders
FC Torpedo Moscow players
FC Vityaz Podolsk players
FC Zimbru Chișinău players
FC Pyunik players
Russian expatriate footballers
Expatriate footballers in Moldova
Expatriate footballers in Armenia
FC Moscow players
FC Dynamo Bryansk players
FC Ararat Moscow players
Sportspeople from Smolensk Oblast